Hajj Mohammad Nakhjavani (1880 – 1962) was an Iranian businessman, scholar, and collector of manuscripts. Born in Tabriz, he received his education at the Talebiya school, where he was taught Arabic and Persian grammar and literature. He followed his father career as a merchant in the bazaar of Tabriz, simultaneously growing an interest in gathering rare manuscripts.

References

Sources 
 

People from Tabriz
1880 births
1962 deaths
20th-century Iranian businesspeople